The State Duma, commonly abbreviated in Russian as Gosduma, is the lower house of the Federal Assembly of Russia, while the upper house is the Federation Council. The Duma headquarters are located in central Moscow, a few steps from Manege Square. Its members are referred to as deputies. The State Duma replaced the Supreme Soviet as a result of the new constitution introduced by Boris Yeltsin in the aftermath of the Russian constitutional crisis of 1993, and approved in a nationwide referendum.

In the 2007 and 2011 Russian legislative elections a full party-list proportional representation with 7% electoral threshold system was used, but this was subsequently repealed. The legislature's term length was initially 2 years in the 1993–1995 elections period, and 4 years in 1999–2007 elections period; since the 2011 elections the term length is 5 years.

History

Early history

The history of the duma dates back to the boyar dumas of Kievan Rus' and Muscovite Russia as well Tsarist Russia. The State Duma of the Russian Empire was founded in 1905 after the violence and upheaval in the Russian Revolution of 1905 and was Russia's first elected parliament. The first two attempts by Tsar Nicholas II (1868-1918) to make it active were ineffective. Subsequently, each of these Dumas was dissolved after only a few months. The third Duma was the only one to last until the end of its five-year term.

After the 1907 electoral reform, the third Duma, elected in November 1907, was largely made up of members of the upper classes, as radical influences in the Duma had almost entirely been removed. The establishment of the Duma after the 1905 Revolution was to herald significant changes to the previous Russian Imperial autocratic system. Furthermore, the Duma was later to have an important effect on Russian history, as it was one of the contributing factors in the February Revolution of 1917, the first of two that year, which led to the abolition of the Tsarist autocracy in Russia and the overthrow of the Tsardom.

Recent history

1990s
Following the dissolution of the Soviet Union and the 1993 Russian constitutional crisis, the Soviet system of government was abolished and a new Constitution was introduced and approved by a referendum. The new Charter transformed the Russian Federation into a federal semi-presidential republic, with a bicameral parliament composed by the State Duma and the Federation Council.

In the December 1993 elections pro-Yeltsin parties won 175 seats in the Duma versus 125 seats for the left bloc. The balance of power lay with the sixty-four deputies of the ultranationalist Liberal Democratic Party of Russia. Only parties that won more than five percent of the vote were given party-list seats: eight passed the threshold in 1993. In addition to those eight parties, a pool of thirty-five deputies was entitled to form a registered group to reflect regional or sectoral interests. Business was governed by a steering committee, the Duma Council, consisting of one person from each party or group. The most important task was dividing up the chair positions in the Duma's twenty-three committees, which was done as part of a power-sharing "package" deal.

Despite the fact that the Russian Constitution states that the State Duma is elected for four years, it was decided to elect the first State Duma for two years. The 1995 election resulted in a strong boost for the Communist Party of the Russian Federation, which became the first political party of Russia and elected 157 seats: a Communist, Gennady Seleznyov, was elected as Speaker of the State Duma. The "presidential party" Our Home – Russia won 55 seats.

During the second half of the 1990s, the Duma became an important forum for lobbying by regional leaders and businessmen looking for tax breaks and legislative favors. The work of the leading committees, such as those for defense, foreign affairs, or budget, attracted a good deal of media attention and lobbying activity.

2000s
In the early 2000s, following the 1999 parliamentary elections, the pro-presidential Unity party and the Communist Party were the leading forces in the State Duma.

After the 2003 elections, a dominant-party system was established with the newly formed pro-presidential United Russia party dominating. In all subsequent elections, United Russia has always received an absolute majority of seats (more than 226). Under the presidency of Vladimir Putin, the State Duma became increasingly referred to as a rubber stamp.

After the 2007 elections, a four-party system was formed with a United Russia, Communist Party, Liberal Democratic Party and A Just Russia. Other parties could not get enough votes to go to the State Duma. Only in 2016 elections, two other parties, Rodina and the Civic Platform, were able to get one seat.

In 2008, after the adoption of amendments to the Constitution, the term of the State Duma was increased from four to five years.

2010s
A 2016 exposé by Dissernet showed that one in nine members of the State Duma had obtained academic degrees with theses that were substantially plagiarized and likely ghostwritten. In 2018, it became known that the State Duma building will be reconstructed. In March 2019 it became known that the repair will begin in May 2019 and will end in September 2020. During this period, the State Duma was temporarily housed in the House of Unions. In addition, a draft of a new conference room, which would be an amphitheatre, was presented.

2020s 
Following the results of the 2021 election, in addition to the four main parties, the New People party was also elected to the State Duma. Thus, for the first time since 1999, a five-party State Duma was formed.

Powers of the State Duma
The State Duma has special powers enumerated by the Constitution of Russia. They are:

 Consent to the appointment of the Prime Minister of Russia.
 Hearing annual reports from the Government of the Russian Federation on the results of its work, including on issues raised by the State Duma.
 Deciding the issue of confidence in the Government of the Russian Federation.
 Appointment and dismissal of the Chairman of the Central Bank of Russia.
 Appointment and dismissal of the Chairman and half of the auditors of the Accounts Chamber.
 Appointment and dismissal of the Commissioner for Human rights, who shall act according to federal constitutional law.
 Announcement of amnesty.
 Bringing charges against the President of the Russian Federation for his impeachment (requires a two-thirds majority).

The State Duma adopts decrees on issues relating to its authority by the Constitution of the Russian Federation.

Election 

The legal framework that is used to elect Duma differed over the years. Save to parliamentary election of 2007 and election of 2011 the mixed system of parallel voting was used to elect Duma. The system was restored back in February 2014 from a party-list proportional representation system enacted in 2003 with an increased threshold of 7% which was lowered this time to 5%.

Constituencies 

According to the law adopted in 2014 the Russian territory is divided into constituencies which are used for elections of single candidates per constituency. However, a single "united" constituency is used for the distribution of party-list.

Procedures

Bills and laws 

Bills of the State Duma are adopted by a majority of the total number of deputies of the State Duma, unless another procedure is envisaged by the Constitution. All bills are first approved by the State Duma and are further debated and approved (or rejected) by the Federation Council.

Relatively few roll call votes have been published that identify individual deputies' votes. The votes of individuals are recorded only if the voting is open and the electronic method is used. While not all votes are officially roll call votes, every time a deputy electronically votes a computer registers the individual deputy's vote.

Membership

Any Russian citizen who is age 21 or older is eligible to participate in the election may be elected deputy to the State Duma. However, that same person may not be a deputy to the Federation Council. In addition, a State Duma deputy cannot hold office in any other representative body of state power or bodies of local self-government. The office as deputy of the State Duma is a full-time and professional position. Thus, deputies to the State Duma may not be employed in the civil service or engage in any activities for remuneration other than teaching, research or other creative activities.

Chairmen of the State Duma 

Ivan Rybkin (1994–1996)
Gennadiy Seleznyov (1996–2003)
Boris Gryzlov (2003–2011)
Sergey Naryshkin (2011–2016)
Vyacheslav Volodin (since 2016)

List of State Duma convocations

Historical composition

Latest election

See also 
 Committee on International Affairs of the State Duma

References

External links 
  

1993 establishments in Russia
Federal Assembly (Russia)
Government of Russia
Russia
Tverskoy District
 
Russian entities subject to the U.S. Department of the Treasury sanctions